Cristian Ramírez is a Paraguayan footballer who played for Cerro Porteño PF from 2008 to 2013.

He amassed 55 appearances in the Primera División Paraguaya.

References

External links
 

Cerro Porteño (Presidente Franco) footballers
Paraguayan footballers
Association football defenders
Year of birth missing (living people)
Living people